Sergey Renev (born 3 February 1985) is a Kazakhstani former road bicycle racer who rode at UCI WorldTeam level for  from 2009 to 2012. He completed the 2010 Vuelta a Espana, and was twice (2008 and 2013) runner up in his national championship. He also competed in the 2010 Milan–San Remo and in the road race at the 2011 UCI Road World Championships.

Major results

2005
 1st  Hill-climb, National Under-23 Road Championships
2007
 3rd GP Capodarco
 4th GP Citta di Felino
2008
 2nd Road race, National Road Championships
2013
 2nd Road race, National Road Championships

References

External links

Sergey Renev at FirstCycling.com

Kazakhstani male cyclists
1985 births
Living people
Place of birth missing (living people)
20th-century Kazakhstani people
21st-century Kazakhstani people